Orlando Thomas (October 21, 1972 – November 9, 2014) was an American football defensive back who played in the National Football League (NFL) from 1995 until 2001. He played his entire career with the Minnesota Vikings.

Biography
Thomas stood 6-1 and weighed 225 pounds during his playing career. He was a second-round draft pick out of the University of Southwestern Louisiana (now University of Louisiana at Lafayette) in 1995. In a Wild Card game of the 1996 NFL Playoffs, Thomas was injured against the Dallas Cowboys. He intercepted a deflected pass, but his knee stuck to the turf at Texas Stadium and he was carted off.  He started 87 of 98 games for the Vikings, intercepting 22 passes, including 9 during his rookie season. He retired following the 2001 season.

On June 29, 1997, he was arrested in his hometown of Crowley, Louisiana and charged with inciting a riot and two counts of disturbing the peace. The charges were reduced to one count of disturbing the peace, and Thomas pleaded no contest. He was ordered to pay a $100 fine, pay court costs, and perform 50 hours of community service.

Thomas married his wife Demetra on February 27, 1998, only two months after their first date and five months after first meeting at Cheese Car Wash in north Minneapolis. He has four children, Alexis, Angelle, Orlando Jr., and Alana, Demetra has a child from a previous relationship.

In 1999, Thomas was charged after allegedly assaulting his wife Demetra. He later pleaded no contest to the misdemeanor charge of simple battery.

Thomas revealed in June 2007 that he was suffering from amyotrophic lateral sclerosis (ALS). On October 28, 2009, it was reported on the Minnesota Vikings' website that Thomas had died, but the organization withdrew the report and apologized to Thomas and his family after it proved to be false. Thomas died of complications from ALS on November 9, 2014.

References

1972 births
2014 deaths
Minnesota Vikings players
American football safeties
Louisiana Ragin' Cajuns football players
People from Crowley, Louisiana
Players of American football from Louisiana
Neurological disease deaths in Louisiana
Deaths from motor neuron disease